A Hare Grows In Manhattan is a Warner Bros. cartoon in the Merrie Melodies series, released on March 22, 1947. It was produced by Edward Selzer and directed by I. Freleng. The short features Bugs Bunny.

Plot
The cartoon begins with the voice of an apparent Hollywood gossip queen named "Lola Beverly" (patterned after newspaper and radio columnist Louella Parsons, infrequently known as "Lolly"; note the next sentence) talking behind the camera as it pans across Beverly Hills, settling in on Bugs Bunny's "mansion", which is actually a rabbit hole with fancy trimmings such as columns and a swimming pool. Lola (or "Lolly" as Bugs calls her familiarly, also effecting her hoity-toity manner of speech) coaxes a biographical story out of Bugs, and he talks about growing up on the Lower East Side of Manhattan (presumably accounting for his accent). He is seen tap-dancing down the streets of the Big Apple and singing "The Daughter of Rosie O'Grady" (a song written in 1917 by Walter Donaldson and Monty C. Brice).

Most of the story involves Bugs being repeatedly assaulted by a "street gang" consisting of a pack of stray dogs, led by a tough-talking but none-too-bright bulldog who wears a bowler hat and turtleneck sweater (and also resembles Hector, a bulldog which appeared in a number of Sylvester/Tweety cartoons starting in 1948). There are at least two references to real-life New York City landmarks. In one scene, Bugs smacks the bulldog with pieces of pie purchased at the Automat; in another, he tries to escape through the Stork Club (spelled here "Stork Klub," wherein real storks are the patrons). Bugs then tries to hide in a rooftop billboard for "Egyptian" cigarettes, a play on animated billboards in Times Square. At one point, the bulldog finds himself hanging by one "hand" from a clothesline. Bugs, on an adjacent line, plays Tweety's time-honored "this little piddy" game (even talking in something close to Tweety's voice), peeling the clumsy canine's "piddies" from the line one by one. When he "runs out of piddies" and the dog falls, Bugs reverts to his normal voice, and his regular aside to the audience, "Gee, ain't I a stinker?"

Bugs thinks he has dispatched the dogs, saying "that's '-30-' for today!"  He goes back to his tap-dancing and singing, and suddenly finds himself in a blind alley next to a newsstand. The gang of dogs reappears and marches in on Bugs menacingly. Bugs grabs a book and threatens to hit them with it in his "last stand". The dogs' eyes open wide when they see the book, and they turn around and race to, and across, the Brooklyn Bridge. The puzzled Bugs looks at the book and sees that it is the then-recent novel, A Tree Grows in Brooklyn, which was obviously the inspiration for the cartoon's title.

Bugs says to himself and the audience, in a rare quiet and reflective moment, "Ya know, maybe I oughta read dis t'ing!" As the underscore reprises an instrumental bar of "Rosie O'Grady", Bugs is seen walking away from the camera and toward the city's skyscrapers, while reading the book and humming along until the scene irises out.

Voice cast and additional crew 
 Mel Blanc voices Bugs Bunny, Spike
 Bea Benaderet voices Lola Beverly
 Tedd Pierce voices Tough Gray Dog
 Other Tough Dogs voiced by Michael Maltese
 Additional Voices by Frances Baruch
 Film Edited by Treg Brown
 Uncredited Orchestration by Milt Franklyn

Production notes 
The short was originally based on a short autobiographical piece of the same name that was published in the December issue of Coronet magazine in 1945. In the autobiography, Bugs recounts his rise and only briefly mentions his days on the streets of Manhattan which he describes as "simple and carefree". He would spend his days throwing rocks at his pals, stealing carrots from local pushcarts, and dealing with thugs using his "rabbit punch" technique.

The story continues in which Bugs reveals that his name was given to him by his family for his funny antics. In time he would land a job at a place called the Palace where he would serve as the rabbit in the hat of the magician the Great Presto. Eventually he would leave for Hollywood, much to the sadness of his parents, to become a star. Which he boasted that he "arrived just in time to save the movies from the hams who was overrunning it".

Analysis 
Andrea Most notes that this short has Bugs Bunny trying to escape his pursuers through constantly changing "costumes, voices, accents, and characters". She also points that throughout the Looney Tunes series, characters would change their "shape, size, character, gender, costume, and performance style" to either outwit or seduce others. She theorizes that the artists of Warner Bros. Cartoons, "mostly Jewish" in origin, were using a trope of transformation and escape which had deeper origins. She finds that many 20th-century comedies with Jewish creators share the theme of escaping through reinventing one's self.

This theme can be found in vaudeville comedy, where the comedians changed roles/identities with simple disguises. It can be found in Whoopee! (1928) and its film adaptation (1930), where Eddie Cantor's Jewish character transforms to "a Greek cook, a black errand boy, and an Indian chief". It can be found in the talent of Fanny Brice for "imitations". It can be found in Girl Crazy (1930), where Willie Howard transforms himself "to a woman, to a variety of famous performers..., to a western sheriff, to an Indian chief." One example is the film To Be or Not to Be (1942) where a mixed company of actors uses their skills in adopting roles to survive in Occupied Poland.`

Home media
VHS- Starring Bugs Bunny
VHS- Bugs Bunny: Hollywood Legend
VHS- The Golden Age Of Looney Tunes Volume 7: Bugs Bunny by Each Director
Laserdisc- Bugs Bunny Classics: Special Collectors Edition
Laserdisc-The Golden Age Of Looney Tunes: Volume 1
DVD- Looney Tunes Golden Collection: Volume 3
DVD- Looney Tunes Platinum Collection: Volume 3

Sources

See also 
List of Bugs Bunny cartoons

References

External links 

 

1947 films
1947 short films
1947 animated films
Animated films about dogs
Animated films set in Manhattan
Short films directed by Friz Freleng
Animated films set in Los Angeles
American gang films
Merrie Melodies short films
Films scored by Carl Stalling
Bugs Bunny films
Films with screenplays by Michael Maltese
1940s Warner Bros. animated short films
Films set in Beverly Hills, California